An electronic visa, electronic entry visa or electronic travel authorisation/electronic travel authority (ETA) is a travel permit in an electronic form. It is often required in addition to a valid passport for access into a particular jurisdiction.

Background
Beginning in the 2000s many countries introduced e-visas and electronic travel authorisations (ETAs) as an alternative to traditional visas. An ETA is a kind of pre-arrival registration, which may or may not be officially classified as a visa depending on the issuing jurisdiction, required for foreign travellers who are exempted from obtaining a full visa. In contrast to the procedures that typically apply in regard to proper visas, per which the traveller normally has no recourse if rejected, if an ETA is rejected the traveller can choose to apply for a visa instead. In contrast, an e-visa is simply a visa that travellers can apply for and receive online without visiting the issuing state's consular mission or visa agency.

Usage
The following jurisdictions require certain categories of international travellers to hold an ETA or e-visa to clear border controls upon arrival:
 Australia: Australia administers two distinct categories of ETA. The Electronic Travel Authority scheme is available to citizens of a variety of North America and Asian countries while the eVisitor scheme provides a similar facility for nationals of the European Union and the European Economic Area.
 Electronic Travel Authority: Development of the Electronic Travel Authority system commenced in January 1996. It was first implemented in Singapore on a trial basis on 11 September 1996, for holders of Singaporean and American passports travelling on Qantas and Singapore Airlines. Implementation of online applications began in June 2001. The current ETA came into effect on 23 March 2013 replacing older ETAs (subclass 976, 977 and 956) while offering a single authorisation for both tourist and business purposes. The ETA allows the holder to visit Australia for unlimited times, up to 3 months per visit, in a 12-month period for tourism or business purposes. There is no visa application charge but a service charge of AU$20 applies for applications lodged online. At the time of travel to, and entry into, Australia, all holders of an ETA must be free from tuberculosis and must not have any criminal convictions for which the sentence or sentences (whether served or not) total 12 months or more. The ETA is currently available to passport holders of a handful of jurisdictions in Asia and North America.
 eVisitor programme: The eVisitor scheme was established to create a reciprocal short stay travel arrangement for nationals of Australia and the European Union, while still maintaining Australia's universal visa system. In essence, while nationals of the European Union and European Economic Area are still theoretically issued visas, the burden posed by the system is so minimal as to satisfy the EU's requirement for visa reciprocity on the part of states whose nationals are accorded visa free access to the Schengen Area. The eVisitor is available to citizens of all 27 European Union member states and 9 other countries. The eVisitor is issued free of charge and allows the holder to visit Australia for unlimited times, up to 3 months per visit, in a 12-month period for tourism or business purposes. At the time of travel to, and entry into, Australia, all holders of an eVisitor must be free from tuberculosis and must not have any criminal convictions for which the sentence or sentences (whether served or not) total 12 months or more. Holders of most jurisdictions in Western Europe are eligible to enter Australia under the eVisitor programme.
 East African Community: From February 2014, Kenya, Rwanda and Uganda issue an East African Tourist Visa. The visa costs 100 USD and has no restrictions on nationality. It is a non-extendable multiple-entry 90-day visa that has to be first used to enter the country that issued it.
 Hong Kong: Indian nationals and Taiwanese nationals from the areas administered by the Republic of China
as formal international travel. There are arrangements exist for travel between territories controlled by the Republic of China and territories controlled by the People's Republic of China.  do not require a visa to enter Hong Kong, but must apply for a pre-arrival registration (PAR) prior to arrival. If not successful, Indian travellers may apply for a visa instead. Taiwanese people are eligible only if they were born in Taiwan or entered Hong Kong as an ROC nationals before, otherwise they should instead apply for an entry permit (a de facto visa) to enter Hong Kong using their Republic of China passport. They may alternatively enter Hong Kong using a Mainland Travel Permit for Taiwan Residents issued by Mainland Chinese authorities without any additional permit.
 India: India permits nationals of most jurisdictions to clear border controls using an e-visa. Travellers holding an e-Visa must arrive via 26 designated airports or 3 designated seaports. As of September 2021, India has suspended the issuance of e-visas to British and Canadian citizens in retaliation for what the Indian government deems discriminatory application of COVID-19 restrictions targeted at Indian nationals.
 Kenya: From 1 January 2021, Kenya solely issues e-visas and physical visas are no longer available.
 New Zealand: New Zealand has required that visa waiver travellers (other than citizens of Australia, members of a visiting force, or individuals associated with a scientific programme or expedition in Antarctica sponsored by a party to the Antarctic Treaty) obtain an Electronic Travel Authority (NZeTA) since 1 October 2019.
 Canada: Travellers from visa-free countries entering Canada by air, except American nationals (including those with and without full citizenship), must obtain an ETA prior to arrival but not if arriving by land or sea. Travellers from Brazil normally require a visa to enter Canada, but are eligible to apply for an ETA if they have held a Canadian visa within the 10 years prior to applying, or if they currently hold a valid non-immigrant American visa. Such travellers still may not enter Canada by land or sea without a valid Canadian visa.
 United States: Travellers under the Visa Waiver Programme are required to obtain permission through the Electronic System for Travel Authorisation if arriving in America by air or cruise but not if entering by land or by ferry, using a passport issued by the Government of Bermuda to a British Overseas Territories Citizen, or if entering as a Canadian citizen.
 Pakistan: Visitors from several jurisdictions may enter Pakistan for tourism without obtaining a visa in advance provided they hold an ETA.
 South Korea: eligible visa-free visitors must obtain Korea Electronic Travel Authorization (K-ETA).
 Sri Lanka: Travellers to Sri Lanka must obtain an ETA prior to getting a visa on arrival at the entry port, except for a few countries where the ETA is exempted, and for a few countries where a visa must obtained in advance. Citizens of India, Pakistan, and other countries in the northwestern part of Asia receive discounted ETAs.
 Qatar: From 27 September 2017, citizens of all nationalities who hold valid residence permits or visas from either Australia, Canada, New Zealand, the Schengen countries, the United Kingdom, the United States of America or the countries of the Gulf Cooperation Council can obtain an ETA for up to 30 days. The visa may be extended online for 30 additional days. Qatar introduced an e-Visa system on 23 June 2017. Visas are issued within four working days if all documents are submitted and are valid for a stay period up to 30 days in Qatar.
 United Kingdom: Citizens of Kuwait, Oman, Qatar, and the UAE can obtain an Electronic Visa Waiver, or EVW, online to enter the United Kingdom. The Nationality and Borders Bill, before the parliament in Spring 2022, includes a proposal to introduce the Electronic Travel Authorisation system for all non-UK and Irish citizens.

An electronic visa (e-Visa or eVisa) is stored in a computer and is linked to the passport number so no label, sticker, or stamp is placed in the passport before travel. The application is done over the internet, and the receipt acts as a visa, which can be printed or stored on a mobile device.

Russia maintains an eVisa program for visitors from certain countries arriving to Russian Far East, Saint Petersburg, Leningrad Region and Kaliningrad Region. And will introduce a single electronic visa from 1 January 2021.

Authorities of Belarus, Chad, Republic of the Congo, Democratic Republic of the Congo, Equatorial Guinea, Ghana, Kazakhstan, Liberia, South Africa, and Tunisia have announced plans to introduce electronic visas in the future.

These lists are not exhaustive. Some countries may have more detailed classifications of some of these categories reflecting the nuances of their respective geographies, social conditions, economies, international treaties, etc.

Notes

References

Visas
Expedited border crossing schemes